Salil Chaturvedi is a director of India-based apparel brand Provogue and a former sailing champion, having represented India in international sailing championships.

Allegation of drug trade
Salil was arrested on 1 August 2005 in a drugs supply case of January 2005, despite protestations of innocence. Eventually, with clearer evidence, the police arrested him and subsequent to the arrest, discovered 3 grams of cocaine in his home. After a long court battle, and 39 days in prison, Salil's innocence was finally proclaimed by the special N.D.P.S act (Narcotic Drugs and Psychotropic Substances Act), 1985, court by the A. T. Amlekar, special N. D. P. S. judge, on 3 April 2009.

In that judgment, the judge Amlekar delivered a scathing indictment of the irregularities and the way the police had "lost sight of basic concept of Law". Two policemen are under the scanner for their involvement in fudging records and planting cocaine at Chaturvedi's Mumbai house. The judge concluded that Chaturvedi was falsely implicated.

References

Businesspeople from Mumbai
Indian sailors
Living people
Year of birth missing (living people)